Against the Christians (Adversus Christianos) is a late-3rd century book written by Roman-Phoenician Neoplatonic philosopher Porphyry of Tyre, criticizing the writings of Christian philosophers and theologians. Due to widespread censorship by Christian imperial authorities, no known copies of this book exist. Only through references to it in Christian writings attacking it can its contents be reconstructed.

Background

During his retirement in Sicily, Porphyry wrote Against the Christians (Κατὰ Χριστιανῶν; Adversus Christianos) which consisted of fifteen books. Some thirty Christian apologists, such as Methodius, Eusebius, Apollinaris, Augustine, Jerome, etc., responded to his challenge. In fact, everything known about Porphyry's arguments is found in these refutations, largely because Theodosius II ordered every copy burned in AD 435 and again in 448.

Augustine and the 5th-century ecclesiastical historian Socrates of Constantinople, assert that Porphyry was once a Christian.

Contents

As quoted by Jerome, Porphyry mocked Paul and the early Christians while suggesting that the 'magical arts' performed by Jesus of Nazareth and his followers were nothing special, done similarly by other figures of Greco-Roman history:

Prophecy of Daniel

Porphyry especially attacked the prophecy of Daniel, because Jews and Christians pointed to the historical fulfillment of its prophecies as a decisive argument. But these prophecies, he maintained, were written not by Daniel but by some Jew who in the time of Antiochus Epiphanes (d. 164 BC) gathered up the traditions of Daniel's life and wrote a history of recent past events but in the future tense, falsely dating them back to Daniel's time. According to Jerome:

See also
 Against the Galileans
 Celsus
 Pliny the Younger on Christians
 The True Word

References

Citations

Cited sources

Further reading
 
 
 

Ancient Roman literature about early Christianity
Anti-Christian sentiment
Books critical of Christianity
Works by Porphyry (philosopher)